No. 240 Squadron RAF was a Royal Air Force flying boat and seaplane squadron during World War I, World War II and up to 1959. It was then reformed as a strategic missile squadron, serving thus till 1963.

History

Formation and World War I
No. 240 Squadron of the Royal Air Force was formed at RAF Calshot on 20 August 1918 to provide anti-submarine protection, using its Short 184s seaplanes and Felixstowe F2A flying boats. It was disbanded on 15 May 1919.

Reformation and World War II

The squadron was re-formed at RAF Calshot on 30 March 1937.  It was at initially equipped with Supermarine Scapas and after a year converted to Short Singapores, which were followed a year later by the Saro London, planning to convert later to Saro Lerwicks, but getting Supermarine Stranraers in June 1940 instead.  During March 1941 these were replaced with Consolidated Catalinas, to carry out anti-submarine patrols over the Atlantic Ocean. It then moved to India in March 1942 where it flew anti-shipping and submarine patrols from Red Hills Lake, where it was disbanded on 1 July 1945.  
The squadron reformed that same day, 1 July 1945, from elements of 212 Squadron and 240 Squadron's Special Duties Flight. The squadron was continuing "special duties" into September 1945, evacuating Operation "Lunch" from the Andaman Islands on 7 September 1945. The squadron converted to Short Sunderland Mk.Vs and moved to Ceylon in 1945, where it disbanded on 31 March 1946 at RAF Koggala.

Post war: Shackletons and Missiles
On 1 May 1952 the squadron re-formed again at RAF Aldergrove and was equipped with Avro Shackleton Mk.1a maritime reconnaissance aircraft.  The squadron moved to Northern Ireland in June 1952, where it disbanded on 1 November 1958 at RAF Ballykelly by being renumbered to 203 sqn.

The squadron reformed once again on 1 August 1959, as one of 20 Thor Strategic Missile (SM) Squadrons, associated with Project Emily. The squadron was equipped with three Thor Intermediate range ballistic missiles, and stationed at RAF Breighton.  
In October 1962, during the Cuban Missile Crisis, the squadron was kept at full readiness, with the missiles aimed at strategic targets in the USSR. The squadron was disbanded with the termination of the Thor Programme in Great Britain, on 8 January 1963.

Aircraft operated

Squadron bases

References
Notes

Bibliography

 Bowyer, Michael J.F. and John D.R. Rawlings. Squadron Codes, 1937-56. Cambridge, UK: Patrick Stephens Ltd., 1979. .
 Flintham, Vic and Andrew Thomas. Combat Codes: A full explanation and listing of British, Commonwealth and Allied air force unit codes since 1938. Shrewsbury, Shropshire, UK: Airlife Publishing Ltd., 2003. .
 Halley, James J. The Squadrons of the Royal Air Force & Commonwealth, 1918-1988. Tonbridge, Kent, UK: Air Britain (Historians) Ltd., 1988. .
 Jefford, C.G. RAF Squadrons, a Comprehensive record of the Movement and Equipment of all RAF Squadrons and their Antecedents since 1912. Shrewsbury, Shropshire, UK: Airlife Publishing, 1988 (second edition 2001). .
 Rawlings, John D.R. Coastal, Support and Special Squadrons of the RAF and their Aircraft. London: Jane's Publishing Company Ltd., 1982. .

External links

 History of No.'s 236–240 Squadrons at RAF Web

240 Squadron
Aircraft squadrons of the Royal Air Force in World War II
Maritime patrol aircraft squadrons
1918 establishments in the United Kingdom
Military units and formations of Ceylon in World War II
Military units and formations established in 1918
Military units and formations disestablished in 1963